Ralph Swimer (14 October 1914 – 28 February 1998) was a British bridge player. During that World Bridge Federation championship tournament in Buenos Aires, the British pair Terence Reese and Boris Schapiro were accused of cheating.

Alan Truscott—bridge editor for The New York Times from 1 January 1964 until his death in 2005—covered the January 1965 tournament, where he helped develop the allegations, convince Captain Swimer, and testify for the WBF hearing. Decades later, his NYT bridge column in obituary of Swimer featured the affair. "In England", Truscott summarised, "Swimer was hailed as a hero by some but targeted as a villain by others."

Swimer was a member of the 1960 Great Britain open team in Turin, which finished second to France in the first quadrennial World Team Olympiad. His partner there was Jeremy Flint, who also played on the 1965 Bermuda Bowl team that Swimer led as npc.

Swimer was born in Poland and came to Britain in the early 1920s. He died in London, England, after a short illness.

Notes

References

External links
 
 "Sensational Scandal in Buenos Aires full story" at Shenkin's World of Bridge, by Barnet Shenkin (28 May 2010) – originally published as "Scandal in Buenos Aires" in four parts (17 March to 28 May)

1914 births
1998 deaths
British and Irish contract bridge players
Place of birth missing
Polish emigrants to the United Kingdom